Şenköy (old name: Kutunet-i Süfla (قوطونت سفلا)) is a village in the Arhavi District, Artvin Province, Turkey. Its population is 25 (2021).

References

Villages in Arhavi District
Laz settlements in Turkey